Baldanders or Soon-Different is a creature of Germanic literary myth that features  protean properties.

Origin
Baldanders (Soonchanged, Soon-Different) is a character in the novel Simplicius Simplicissimus by Grimmelshausen, appearing in its Continuatio (1669) or Sixth Book. The character was appropriated from Hans Sachs's poem Baldanderst  dated to 31 July 1534. Hans Sachs probably derived his "Baldanderst" from Proteus, the shapeshifter of classical Greco-Roman mythology.

The hero of the story meets Baldanders when he stumbles upon a stone statue of an ancient Germanic hero, dressed in a Roman soldier's outfit with a large Swabian codpiece (i.e., or "flap  of the breeches") (literally "Swabian bib".). Baldanders claims to have met Sachs in July 1534, teaching the writer the secret art of conversing with inanimate objects. The protagonist begs to learn the art, and Baldanders offers to teach it, and administers a test in the form of a riddle consisting of a jumble of nonce words. Baldanders subsequently changes into a succession of forms: an oak tree, a sow, a bratwurst sausage, then a peasant's excrement, a meadow of clovers, cow dung, a flower, mulberry tree, and silk carpet. The significance of these objects is that the oak produces acorns that are eaten by the female pig, then turned into sausage, and eaten by human, in a natural cycle of things that perish and are reborn.

According to Sachs’ and collected descriptions, the Baldanders is a creature that is symbolic for the continual change in nature and society as well as the importance of familiarizing oneself with the common from another perspective.

The idea Baldanders appeared in illustration as the satyr-headed, winged, and fish-tailed composite creature in the frontispiece drawing of the book (image here) had been espoused by writer Jorge Luis Borges (El libro de los seres imaginarios), but that idea has been refuted.

Popular culture

Being a creature of literature, the Baldanders is not often featured in contemporary works. However, there have been a few mentions and inclusions of the creature in various media.

In further literature, the Baldanders was included in The Book of Imaginary Beings (El libro de los seres imaginarios) compiled by novelist Jorge Luis Borges.

In The Book of the New Sun series by Gene Wolfe, a recurring character's name was Baldanders, which Wolfe affirmed was based on Borges' description. In Chanda Hahn's UnEnchanted series book three, Fable, the baldander appears as a small, shape-shifting creature. In music, the Baldanders was the subject of a song by the 1970s German folk/progressive rock band Ougenweide.

Baldanders is a regular character in the bi-weekly, alternate history webcomic What Happened When created by Andrew Scott and Carlos Morote. In this comic's alternate universe, Baldanders fulfils his original role as a 'Trickster' who also gives sage advice to his fellow members of The Ghost Club concerning an epidemic of rage-fuelled madness in Victorian London presumably caused by an onslaught of souls returning from the land of the dead.

The Baldanders is also mentioned in Japanese video games. In the Sega Mega Drive game Curse, the player controls the Baldanders star fighter, which was created by an ancient alien super technology. The PlayStation 2 and portable game Puyo Puyo Fever 2 features a character who is a large dog in knight's armor named Baldanders. In the game Final Fantasy XIII, Baldanders is an antagonist and fal'Cie who poses as a human named Galenth Dysley; in the English translation, his name is Latinized as Barthandelus. In the board-game-like Culdcept, Baldanders is a creature that temporarily changes into a different, random creature every time it fights. In Kazuhiro Fujita's manga, Ushio and Tora, Baldanders appears in the form of a small child, but also can become a ghost-like entity when fighting.

Explanatory notes

References
Citations

Bibliography

  Free download.

External links
 Spiegel Online: Baldanders Role in Simplicius Simplicissimus

Germanic mythology
Shapeshifting